Mark Alan Webber  (born 27 August 1976) is an Australian retired professional racing driver who competed in Formula One from 2002 to 2013 and the FIA World Endurance Championship (WEC) between 2014 and 2016. He is a champion of the 2015 FIA WEC for Porsche with German Timo Bernhard and New Zealander Brendon Hartley.

Webber began karting at age 12 or 13 and achieved early success, winning regional championships before progressing to car racing in the Australian Formula Ford Championship and the British Formula 3 Championship. He competed for two years opposite Bernd Schneider in the FIA GT Championship with the AMG Mercedes team, finishing runner-up in the 1998 season with five wins in ten races before finishing second in the 2001 International Formula 3000 Championship driving for Super Nova Racing. Webber remained at Williams until the 2006 campaign, driving for the Red Bull squad for the rest of his F1 career.

He left F1 after 2013 and moved to the WEC, sharing a Porsche 919 Hybrid with Bernhard and Hartley in the fully-professional Le Mans Prototype 1 class from the 2014 to 2016 seasons. The trio won eight races in the final two seasons and the 2015 World Endurance Drivers' Championship. He retired from motor sport in 2016, becoming a television pundit for Britain's Channel 4 and Australia's Network 10 and a driver manager. Webber received the Australian Sports Medal in 2000 and was appointed Officer of the Order of Australia (AO) in the 2017 Australia Day Honours. Webber is an inductee of both the Australian Motor Sport Hall of Fame and the FIA Hall of Fame.

Early and personal life

On 27 August 1976, Webber was born to middle-class parents, motorcycle dealer and petrol station owner Alan Webber and his wife Diane, in the small New South Wales town of Queanbeyan located in the Tablelands, on the Queanbeyan River banks, near Canberra. His paternal grandfather was a firewood merchant. Webber has an elder sister, Leanne. He was educated at the nearby Isabella Street Primary School and Karabar High School (KHS). Webber represented KHS in athletics and rugby league and did Australian rules football, cricket and swimming after his mother encouraged him to get involved in as many sports as possible. At age 13, he was a ball boy for the rugby league team Canberra Raiders for a year and earned money delivering pizzas in the Canberra and Queanbeyan areas in his late schooling years. Webber also worked as an apprentice plumber and woodcutter. He lives in the small Buckinghamshire village of Aston Clinton with his wife Ann Neal and is stepfather to her son from a previous relationship.

Early racing career
Webber began driving motorbikes on weekends from about age four or five on his maternal grandfather's  farm. Webber was not encouraged to seriously take up motorcycling by his father, because he sponsored some local children who were injured in motorbike accidents. At about 12 or 13, he switched to karting, buying a go-kart from a school friend's father. He developed himself at a local indoor go-kart centre near his home. Webber received a second-hand worn out go-kart from his father in 1990 and drove it about once a month at the Canberra Go-Kart Club and in meetings in and around Canberra. Andy Lawson, owner of Queanbeyan Kart Centre, built karts around Webber's frame and Webber's father leased his petrol station and worked long hours at a car dealer to fund his son's karting activities. Webber opted for karting, and made his junior-level karting debut in 1991 aged 14, winning the 1992 Australian Capital Territory and New South Wales (NSW) State championships. In 1993, Webber won the Canberra Cup, the King of Karting Clubman Light Class titles, the 1993 Top Gun Award at the Ian Luff Advanced Driving School, and the 1993 NSW Junior National Heavy Championship in a Lawson kart with a larger, more powerful engine.

In 1994, he made his car racing debut, competing in the eight-round Australian Formula Ford Championship featuring non-aerodynamically dependent open-wheel racing vehicles fitted with treaded tyres. He drove Craig Lowndes' championship-winning 1993 RF93 Van Diemen FF1600 car that his father purchased. Webber achieved a season-high third at Phillip Island Grand Prix Circuit for 14th in the Drivers' Championship with 30 points and second in the Rookie of the Year standings. He was disqualified from the non-championship  Formula Ford support race for passing the field on the formation lap. In late 1994, Webber's father asked English-born media officer Ann Neal to locate sponsorship for Webber; Neal located support from the Australian Yellow Pages after she and Webber reviewed six proposals. Webber moved to Sydney from Queanbeyan to be closer to Australia's motor racing industry. When not racing, he earned money working part-time as a driving instructor at Oran Park Raceway defensive driving school.

He entered the 1995 Australian Formula Ford Championship with Yellow Pages Racing driving a 1995 Van Diemen car, finishing fourth overall with three victories, three pole positions and 158 points in a high-quality field. Webber finished second at both Mallala Motor Sport Park rounds of the 1995 Australian Drivers' Championship driving a Birrana Racing Reynard 90D-Holden car for seventh in the Drivers' Championship with 32 points. In October 1995, he moved to the London suburb of Hainault, to further his racing career. He entered the Formula Ford Festival at Brands Hatch with the Van Diemen factory team, and finished the race third. The result impressed team owner Ralph Firman Sr. enough to sign Webber to Van Diemen for both the 1996 European Formula Ford Championship and the 1996 British Formula Ford Championship, finishing third and second overall, respectively. He won four races in the British series, finishing second in the championship behind teammate Kristian Kolby, and was also third in the Formula Ford Euro Cup driving two of the three rounds with a win at the Circuit de Spa-Francorchamps. Webber won the Formula Holden  support race, and the Formula Ford Festival.

In 1997, he elected to skip Formula Renault and Formula Vauxhall on sponsors advice, and signed a contract to progress to the higher-tier British Formula Three Championship with Alan Docking Racing (ADR). Webber was ADR's lead driver complemented by two funded non-competitive teammates, and was told to bring funding to ADR. Driving a Dallara F397 car powered by an old Mugen Honda engine purchased by the Webber family, he won the Brands Hatch Grand Prix event and came fourth overall with 131 points. Webber was voted Rookie of the Year as 1997's highest-placed rookie. His funding almost dried up mid-season until motor racing journalist Peter Windsor suggested Webber solicit funding from rugby union player and family friend David Campese to complete the year and stop Webber ending his international career early. Webber's season was put on a race-by-race basis and he received offers from Renault and Jackie Stewart. He also finished third in the Masters of Formula 3 and fourth in the Macau Grand Prix for ADR.

Sports car racing and International Formula 3000 (1998–2001)

After testing at the A1 Ring, Webber rejected an offer from Mercedes-Benz motorsports boss Norbert Haug to drive a CLK GTR car at the FIA GT Nürburgring 4 Hours in place of Alexander Wurz. However, he did agree to race for the AMG Mercedes team in the 1998 FIA GT Championship. Haug selected Webber after AMG Mercedes' Gerhard Ungar liked Webber's tenacity. Webber was paired with touring car driver Bernd Schneider, who mentored him driving-wise and in vehicle mechanics. Driving the  1 Mercedes-Benz CLK GTR, he and Schneider won five races and took eight podium finishes, finishing championship runner-up to teammates Klaus Ludwig and Ricardo Zonta after a title duel with the sister team lasting to the season's final round.

In June 1998, Webber entered his first 24 Hours of Le Mans having pre-qualified due to Schneider's 1997 FIA GT Championship win. He, Ludwig and Schnieder retired their Le Mans-specific CLK-LM car after 75 minutes due to a steering pump fault causing an engine failure. Late in the year, Campese Management managed Webber until Neal resumed her professional relationship with Webber; she suggested that Webber enter the International Formula 3000 (IF3000) in 1999 pending funding. Webber entered the 1999 24 Hours of Le Mans after the Fédération Internationale de l'Automobile (FIA) abolished the FIA GT Championship GT1 category due to a lack of manufacturer entries for 1999. Sharing the No. 4 Mercedes-Benz CLR with Jean-Marc Gounon and Marcel Tiemann, a car aerodynamic fault caused Webber to go airborne in qualifying between Mulsanne Corner and Indianapolis corner and on the Mulsanne Straight in race-day warm up, forcing his withdrawal from the race.

Webber's relationship with Mercedes-Benz cooled following Le Mans because he felt they were unworried about him. He rejected Haug's offer to compete in American open-wheel racing. Greg Moore's death in an accident in California in October 1999 prompted Webber to focus on European single-seater racing. His Mercedes-Benz contract was terminated around November following negotiations. Airline magnate Paul Stoddart, through talks with Jordan Grand Prix team owner Eddie Jordan, offered to underwrite $1.1 million for Webber to combine F3000 and planned Formula One (F1) testing. Webber signed to drive a Lola-Ford Zytek car for the Arrows F3000 team in the 2000 IF3000 Championship, finishing third in the Drivers' Championship with 21 points, winning at Silverstone, achieving two podium results and retiring four times.

For 2001, he moved to the Benetton Formula-affiliated, reigning teams' champions Super Nova Racing, replacing Nicolas Minassian. Webber, the title favourite, tended to overestimate the Lola car's grip whilst combining F3000 racing with regular access to F1 vehicles for testing. Webber won at Imola, Monaco and Magny-Cours and was second at the Nürburgring. Four consecutive retirements in the final four rounds prevented him from winning the championship, and he scored 39 points, finishing runner-up to Justin Wilson.

Formula One career (1999–2013)

Testing (1999–2001)
Webber made his F1 test debut with the Arrows team in a two-day session organised by Stoddart at the Circuit de Catalunya in December 1999. Webber received a three-day evaluation test at Estoril two months later following talks with Benetton. After that, Webber and his legal team agreed terms with Benetton team owner Flavio Briatore to be Benetton's test and reserve driver. He developed the car for racers Jenson Button and Giancarlo Fisichella for 2001 and would replace one of them if they got ill or injured. Webber tested frequently for Benetton and helped to improve the team's performance for the season's end. He joined Briatore's managerial stable in May 2001 on a ten-year contract when Neal said that she wanted to step back from driver management.

Minardi and Jaguar (2002–2004)

Ron Walker and telecommunications company Telstra successfully lobbied for Webber to replace Fernando Alonso at Minardi for the first three races of the  season. Webber's Minardi PS02-Asiatech car was underdeveloped and he was barely able to fit inside it due to his height. He hoped to become experienced enough to make progress in F1. He qualified 18th for the season-opening  and finished fifth following a plethora of first-lap retirements in his debut race. Stoddart consequently retained Webber for the rest of the season. At the  four races later, Webber and his teammate Alex Yoong were withdrawn from the race due to three wing failures during practice. He outperformed Yoong and the latter's two-race replacement Anthony Davidson since he was the only Minardi driver using power steering due to budgetary constraints. Webber was 16th overall with two points.

In 2002, Webber's management were concerned about Minardi's financial situation. They arranged a test session and evaluation in the more powerful Jaguar R3 in mid-2002. Toyota and Jaguar were interested in Webber, but he joined Jaguar in November 2002, replacing the aging Eddie Irvine. Webber was underprepared as his Jaguar R4 car had a highly unreliable Cosworth V10 engine and rapidly wearing rear tyres. Webber scored points seven times in 2003 with his best result being three sixth-places for 10th in the Drivers' Championship with 17 points. Webber crashed less frequently than he had done in F3000, and his qualifying and race pace saw him outperform both Antônio Pizzonia and Wilson. He was touted as a future star despite poor reliability and a weak car package.

Webber was offered a five-year extension to his contract but signed a two-year extension instead. During the  season, Webber contributed to the Jaguar R5's technical development and was consistent year-round, extracting extra car performance and regularly outperforming his Red Bull-backed teammate Christian Klien. He drove the underperforming and unreliable R5 vehicle causing him to retire from 8 out of 18 races. He placed 13th overall with 7 points.

Williams (2005–2006)
Frank Williams, the Williams team owner, was interested in Webber and he and Neal thought driving for the team would advance his career. Webber activated a performance clause that released him from Jaguar if an improved offer came along. He was granted an early release from Jaguar following the season-ending  so he could test for Williams, and prepared for the season by doing fitness training with cyclist Lance Armstrong at a training camp in Texas.

Webber replaced the Toyota-bound Ralf Schumacher at Williams, and was joined by Nick Heidfeld for most of the season and Pizzonia for the final five races following injury to Heidfeld. The Williams FW27 car was aerodynamically poor due to incorrectly calibrated wind tunnels, lacked race speed and was poor starting, seeing him lose positions after qualifying well. In a pre-season test session in mid-February, he sustained a broken left-side rib and damaged rib cartilage when he did not exercise correctly prior to driving. In the first two races of the season he competed on painkillers prescribed to him by FIA medical director Gary Hartstein to manage the pain from these injuries. Webber finished third in Monaco for his first F1 podium finish and tallied points in ten races in 2005. His best start was second in Spain and qualified within the top five in the first seven rounds. Webber was involved in five race collisions and burnt his right hip in France due to heat generated by an failed external electronics box penetrating his car's cockpit. He was 10th in the Drivers' Championship with 36 points, admitting that his reputation faltered. Webber out-qualified Heidfeld nine times, beat him six times and out-qualifying Pizzonia five times that season.

Although informed by Frank Williams and technical director Patrick Head of his poor performance, Webber remained at Williams for  since no other driver wanted to drive for the team. He became distant from Williams and disliked its management because he expected to feel comfortable there; he stayed with the team because he felt "there was something left" and was loyal to Williams, and rejected an offer to join the BMW Sauber team. Webber's teammate that year was GP2 Series champion Nico Rosberg. His FW28 car ran Bridgestone tyres and a Cosworth V8 engine after BMW ended its partnership with Williams and purchased the Sauber team. His unreliable, under-powered car retired inside the top three in both Australia and Monaco early in 2006. Webber was 14th overall tallying 7 points; his best results were two sixth places in Bahrain and San Marino.

Red Bull Racing (2007–2013)

2007–2009 
Webber did not re-sign with the team after he was offered less money for a two-year contract. Webber became disillusioned with F1 because their press relations would not let competitors speak freely to the press. Briatore directed Webber to the Red Bull Racing team; they became interested in the team after they purchased Jaguar in late 2004 and signed world championship-winning technical director Adrian Newey to design the RB3-Renault car. His switch from Williams to Red Bull was confirmed in August 2006, replacing Klien and partnering the experienced David Coulthard. His move to Red Bull had been surprising as it was formed to promote young drivers and the drinks company.

Before the season, Webber enquired about Red Bull adviser and junior formula team owner Helmut Marko for his treatment of young drivers and was told by team principal Christian Horner to obey Marko to avoid conflict. The RB3 proved to be a quick but unreliable car, causing Webber to retire seven times during the season. He scored his first points of 2007 when he finished seventh in the United States and took his second career podium finish with a third-place finish at the  three races later. He was on course to finish well at the rain-affected  until Toro Rosso's Sebastian Vettel crashed into the rear of his car behind the safety car, eliminating both drivers from the race. Webber tallied 10 points for 12th overall and beat his teammate Coulthard 15 times in qualifying.

Webber remained at Red Bull for the  season and was again joined by Coulthard, driving a more reliable RB4 car equipped with a new reliable gearbox and a heavier front. Webber frequently qualified well and scored points at nine of the season's 18 rounds. He qualified a season-high second for the  but finished tenth in the wet-weather race. Thereafter, Webber's performance for the remainder of the season diminished mainly because Red Bull opted to sacrifice speed so it could focus on constructing a new car to comply with the regulation changes being applied for the  championship. He scored points three more times in the final nine races for 21 points and 11th in the Drivers' Championship.

Because of Red Bull's performance, Webber remained at the team for 2009. 
Webber sustained multiple injuries in a head-on collision with a car at a charity endurance cycling event in Port Arthur, Tasmania in November 2008, including a fractured right leg. He skipped a three-day pre-season test session held at the Jerez circuit, but was able to regain enough fitness to drive in an F1 car at the 2009 pre-season test sessions at Jerez and Barcelona, due to the late launch of the RB5 car. Webber underwent surgery between events to avoid contracting infections.

Vettel, who was promoted from Toro Rosso to replace the retiring Coulthard, became Webber's teammate. Webber consistently scored points in seven of the first eight races, including three podium finishes to briefly become a championship contender. His performances improved when the new RB5 car's double diffuser was introduced. Webber was informed by Red Bull that he and Vettel could race each other "for the foreseeable future" even when trying to reduce Button's points lead. He moved to second overall after finishing third in Hungary but fell to fourth due to driver, team and reliability errors in the next four races.

2010–2013 

Webber and Red Bull negotiated a contract extension to the  championship to reward his performance in 2009. His RB6 car was designed to channel engine exhaust gases through a bodywork slot to the diffuser's central area for more downforce and cornering speed. A knee training injury forced Webber to delay his preparation because a surgeon conducted a full knee incision. Upon his return to racing, he led the Drivers' Championship at various points during the season, achieving four Grand Prix victories and three pole positions. Webber need to win the race and for Alonso to place third or lower to secure the championship. He was eighth in the race, which Vettel won and Alonso came seventh. Webber was third overall with 242 points. After the season, Webber was angry with Red Bull's management, thinking they devalued his achievements that year.

Webber's mental state worsened because he was ready to retire after a title win to stop all negativity related to his racing career. His RB7 car equipped with the kinetic energy recovery system (KERS) and drag reduction system devices and an exhaust-blown diffuser produced lots of rear grip. Webber was hindered by intermittent KERS failures that Red Bull rectified and he was frustrated with the quickly degrading Pirelli tyres losing their performance when a driver was in the aerodynamic turbulence of another car. He made slower starts due to the car's ballast distribution compromised by the KERS' additional weight exacerbated by him weighing  more than Vettel.

Dietrich Mateschitz, Red Bull's owner, directed the team to allow both Webber and Vettel to race each other. Webber came no lower than fifth in the first four races, finishing third and second in China and Turkey. He finished the  fourth from pole position. Webber took consecutive pole positions at the British and German Grands Prix and seven podiums from eleven top-tens in the next 13 events. He won the season-ending  to take third overall from Alonso with a career-high 258 points. Webber initially struggled with the new Pirelli tyres, producing a greater amount of lateral load than his teammate Vettel and was more aggressive accelerating. His qualifying and race performances improved once he became better acquainted with the tyres. Webber made fewer pit stops by coping strategies used by other drivers after previously stopping more often from racing competitively.

Webber's decision to re-sign was made more difficult in mid-2011 because of his poor qualifying performance on Pirelli tyres but noted the potential of Newey's car designs. The RB8 car was not as dominant as its two predecessors; Webber finished fourth in the first four races, hampered by minor mechanical problems and faulty KERS. Webber took two more podium finishes in Korea and India during the season's final 11 races, finishing 2012 sixth overall tallying 179 points.

Webber remained at Red Bull for the  championship: he wanted to honour an earlier promise he had made to Horner and Mateschitz to stay at the team until his F1 career was over. He rejected an offer from Ferrari team principal Stefano Domenicali to partner Alonso and replace Felipe Massa for a year with a second optional, feeling switching teams would be inappropriate. He briefly lightened his training over the pre-season period when a titanium rod in his right leg was removed in December 2012. After restarting training that month, Webber decided to retire from F1 after 2013 because he wanted to spend more time with his family, demotivation with F1 since drivers could not criticise Pirelli's tyres for fear of possibly upsetting others and the politics when large sums of money were involved. Webber was assigned Simon Rennie as his race engineer when his previous engineer, Ciaron Pilbeam, became the Lotus team's chief race engineer.

His RB9 car initially struggled possibly due to its aerodynamic profile on the new softer Pirelli compounds but performed better when the 2012 compounds were re-introduced mid-season. Tension between both drivers rose as a result and a remark by Webber about Vettel making an independent decision to disobey team orders meant Vettel lost Webber's respect as a person. After that, Webber was aware that the rest of the season would be onerous and tension between him and Vettel would stress Red Bull. Webber won no races in 2013 and he concluded his final F1 season in third overall with 199 points.

Return to endurance racing with Porsche (2014–2016)
Webber joined Porsche's sports car team upon its return to motor racing in mid-2013. He moved to sports car racing to get away from the attention associated with F1 and to enjoy the longer intervals between races. Webber shared the No. 20 closed-cockpit Porsche 919 Hybrid sports prototype car with German Timo Bernhard and New Zealander Brendon Hartley in the FIA World Endurance Championship (WEC)'s fully-professional Le Mans Prototype 1-Hybrid (LMP1-H) category.

Although sports car racing was less physically demanding for Webber, he needed consistently high concentration to cope with the difference in speed between each of the WEC's four classes, driving at night, re-adjusting to lapping slower vehicles while losing the least amount of time and coping with changeable conditions during a long race. Webber was advised on modern sports car racing by Bernhard and in turn acquainted Bernhard and Hartley with the circuits he drove in F1. He was mindful on developing the car for his co-drivers and not for himself but directed Porsche to concentrate on research and development projects that optimised performance in the shortest possible time. Webber also helped the team reduce the amount of pit stop time.

The 2014 season began with Webber qualifying sixth and finishing third at the season-opening 6 Hours of Silverstone. Hybrid technical issues at the following 6 Hours of Spa-Francorchamps left Webber and his co-drivers 23rd overall. At the 24 Hours of Le Mans, Webber's team qualified the No. 20 car second and retired with a broken anti-roll bar 22 hours in. The next four races saw him finish no lower than sixth, placing third at both the 6 Hours of Fuji and the 6 Hours of Bahrain. At the season-ending 6 Hours of São Paulo, his team qualified on pole position; late in the race, Matteo Cressoni's No. 90 AF Corse-run 8 Star Motorsports Ferrari 458 Italia hit the right-rear of his car, sending Webber into a concrete barrier. Webber sustained a left lung contusion and severe concussion, recovering from the effects of the crash weeks later. He was ninth in the World Endurance Drivers' Championship (WEDC) with 64.5 points.

Porsche retained Webber for the 2015 season alongside Bernhard and Hartley in the renumbered No. 17 car. Webber and Hartley qualified the car on pole position for the season-opening 6 Hours of Silverstone but Webber had to retire it with drivetrain failure. He was on pole position at the following 6 Hours of Spa-Francorchamps and finished third after Hartley incurred a stop-and-go penalty for rejoining the track via an escape road. He qualified and finished second at the 24 Hours of Le Mans. before claiming four consecutive victories to enter the season-ending 6 Hours of Bahrain leading Audi's Marcel Fässler, André Lotterer and Benoît Tréluyer by 12 points. Webber and his teammates needed to finish third to win the WEDC. They qualified on pole position and overcame mechanical problems to finish fifth and claim the title with 166 points, five ahead of Fässler, Lotterer and Tréluyer.

Webber again remained at Porsche alongside Bernhard and Hartley in the renumbered No. 1 entry for the 2016 championship. The crew retired from the season-opening 6 Hours of Silverstone following a collision between Hartley and a slower Porsche GT car. At the following 6 Hours of Spa-Francorchamps, two tyre punctures and a front axle gearbox problem left him 27th overall. Webber began from second at the 24 Hours of Le Mans and finished 13th overall due to a water pump failure that needed fixing when Webber was driving. The rest of the season saw the crew win four of the next six races and qualify on pole position once for fourth in the WEDC with 134.5 points.

Retirement (2017–present)
Webber decided to retire from motor racing after the season was over. He kept the news secret until going to Japan, citing Porsche's dwindling desire to commit fully to its LMP1 programme and the difficulty of doing "this job half-hearted" with regards of getting motivated to do test sessions and races as reasons.

Webber was due to compete in the American-based short track oval racing series Superstar Racing Experience in 2021; travel restrictions caused by the COVID-19 pandemic meant Webber was ultimately unable to.

Driving style
In describing Webber's driving style, journalist Mark Hughes stated: "The thing he does arguably better than anyone else, is extract every ounce of potential from the car through fast, aerodynamically-loaded corners" since extra lap time could be located in slower turns because the car remains in them for longer. He was able to feel the braking grip of his tyres and could correctly modulate throttle power as grip levels reduced under braking to slow the vehicle down. Entering a braking zone, Webber achieved more retardation rate in a downforce-reliant car than other drivers and as the downforce decreased he was able to modulate pressure and sensitivity well to remain within the tyre's grip limit. His braking pressure force enabled him to translate lap time where the entry speed is high enough to make this possible without brake locking. His driving style, which was refined in downforce-heavy sports cars in the late 1990s, was not suited to a more gentle approach required for driving V8 F1 Pirelli-shod cars because of how he managed those brand of tyres that wore out faster than the Bridgestone compounds he was accustomed to.

Non-driving work

Webber is a brand ambassador of the luxury fashion house Hugo Boss, the car brand Porsche, the watch manufacturer Rolex, the synthetic engine oil brand Mobil 1, the airline carrier Qantas, and the spinal cord injury research charity Wings for Life. In July 2003, he helped to launch that year's Road Safety Handbook aiming to give road safety guides for residents of Milton Keynes. As a result of his endorsement money and salary, he was included in Australia's Top 50 Sports Earners and the BRW Young Rich lists by BRW magazine. From 2009 to 2013, Webber and Horner co-owned the MW Arden junior team that ran in the European-based GP3 Series. He launched the off-road sports clothing brand Aussie Grit for mountain riding and running in 2018, and fronted Porsche and Boss' clothing collections for 2019 and 2020.

In 2003, Webber began the ten-day  adventure challenge trek Mark Webber Challenge featuring cross-country running, cycling and kayaking in Tasmania to raise money for children's cancer charities. He organised it following his grandfather's death from cancer as well as his experiences of friends whose children had cancer. Webber held the challenge again from 2006 to 2008 but not in 2009 and 2010 due to economical problems. He again held the event with corporate and local government sponsorship from 2011 to 2013. Inspire Young People and Webber created the Mark Webber Youth Challenge in 2014 involving college student teams raising money for charity participating in physical activities. He was patron of the Amy Gillett Foundation promoting safer on-road relationships between cyclists and motorists, and of the Aylesbury College Trust. Webber won the F1 pro-am tennis tournament in Barcelona three times. He supported the use of the AI-operated prostate cancer diagnosis device Maxwell Plus in Queanbeyan in November 2021 following a reduction in testing during the COVID-19 pandemic.

Webber has written columns for Autosport, the BBC, and The Sydney Daily Telegraph. He has provided expert analysis on F1 for the British television broadcaster Channel 4 since the  season. Webber has done a similar role for Australia's Channel 10, covering the Australian Grand Prix and co-hosting the 2015 Clipsal 500 of the V8 Supercars Championship for the broadcaster. He was guest reporter for two rounds of the 2017 World Rally Championship on Red Bull TV. Since early 2020, Webber has mentored racing driver Oscar Piastri and represents his commercial interests through the management arm JAM Sports Management he founded with his wife, and corporate and sports CEO Jason Allen. He authored the book, Up Front – 2010, A Season To Remember, in 2010. Webber's autobiography, Aussie Grit: My Formula One Journey, ghost written by Stuart Sykes, was published in 2015. Webber owned a public house, The Stag, in Mentmore. He joined documentary makers Noah Media Group as an producer and an investor in November 2021.

Assessment and honours

Webber is nicknamed "Aussie Grit" for "his determination in the face of adversity and his patriotism." Bruce Jones described Webber in the book The Story of Formula One: 65 Years of Life in the Fast Lane as having earned "considerable admiration for his straight-talking, honest approach that was devoid of pretence or hyperbole. He is an out-and-out racer cast from something of an old-fashioned mould and as such often seemed an adult in an increasingly infantile world." BBC Sport's Andrew Benson wrote that Webber's "combination of race-winning pace and forthright manner has made him a central figure in F1 over the last decade" and that Webber had "remained true to himself. He is unimpressed with the trappings of F1 and its supposed glamour. And his willingness to follow his own mind is intact."

In October 2003, Webber was unanimously voted fourth director of the trade union Grand Prix Drivers' Association (GPDA). He was voted out of it in September 2005 since it felt there were too many directors in charge. Webber won the BRDC Bruce McLaren Award in 1998, 2000, 2001, 2009, and 2010 as "the Commonwealth driver who has established the most meritorious performances in international motor racing." In October 2000, he received the Australian Sports Medal for placing second in the 1998 FIA GT Championship and participating in the IF3000 Championship; was voted "Rookie of the Year" by both readers of F1 Racing and Autosport magazines; named "F1 Newcomer of the Year" at the annual Grand Prix Party Awards; was named Autocar's magazine; 2003 F1 Driver of the Year; won the Lorenzo Bandini Trophy in 2006; and the 2009 Innes Ireland Trophy for displaying "courage and sportsmanship" that Innes Ireland epitomised.

Webber received the Hawthorn Memorial Trophy in 2010 and 2013 as the most successful British or Commonwealth driver during a season; the 2010 GQ Australia Sportsman of the Year; the 2011 DHL Fastest Lap Award for setting more fastest laps than any driver that year with seven; and the 2013 Johnny Wakefield Trophy for recording the year's best lap on the Silverstone GP Circuit. He was appointed Officer of the Order of Australia (AO) in the 2017 Australia Day Honours for "distinguished service to motor sport as a competitor and ambassador, and to the community through fundraising and patronage of a range of medical and youth support organisations." Webber was added to the Australian Motor Sport Hall of Fame and the FIA Hall of Fame in 2018 and 2019, respectively. In 2022, he was inducted into Sport Australia Hall of Fame.

Racing record

Career summary

Complete FIA GT Championship results

Complete 24 Hours of Le Mans results

Complete International Formula 3000 results
(key) (Races in bold indicate pole position) (Races in italics indicate fastest lap; small number denotes finishing position)

Complete Formula One results
(key) (Races in bold indicate pole position) (Races in italics indicate fastest lap; small number denotes finishing position)

 Half points awarded as less than 75% of race distance was completed by the winner.
 Did not finish, but was classified as he had completed more than 90% of the race distance.

Complete FIA World Endurance Championship results

Notes

References

Bibliography

External links

 
 
 
 

1976 births
Living people
People from Queanbeyan
Australian expatriate sportspeople in England
Racing drivers from New South Wales
Formula Ford drivers
Formula Holden drivers
Formula One race winners
British Formula Three Championship drivers
24 Hours of Le Mans drivers
FIA GT Championship drivers
International Formula 3000 drivers
BRDC Gold Star winners
Australian Formula One drivers
Minardi Formula One drivers
Jaguar Formula One drivers
Red Bull Formula One drivers
Williams Formula One drivers
FIA World Endurance Championship drivers
Officers of the Order of Australia
Alan Docking Racing drivers
Mercedes-AMG Motorsport drivers
Super Nova Racing drivers
Porsche Motorsports drivers
Sport Australia Hall of Fame inductees